The 47th César Awards ceremony, presented by the Académie des Arts et Techniques du Cinéma, took place on 25 February 2022 honouring the best French films of 2021. Screenwriter and director Danièle Thompson presided the ceremony that was hosted by Antoine de Caunes. Australian actress and producer Cate Blanchett received the Honorary César. The ceremony was dedicated to actor Gaspard Ulliel, who died on 19 January 2022.

Drama film Lost Illusions led all nominees with 15 nominations, followed by Annette and Aline with eleven and ten nominations, respectively. Lost Illusions went on to win seven awards, more than any other film in the ceremony, including Best Film.

Winners and nominees
The nominees for the 47th César Awards were announced on 26 January 2022. Winners are listed first and highlighted in boldface.

Films with multiple nominations
The following films received multiple nominations:

Films with multiple wins
The following films received multiple wins:

See also
 34th European Film Awards
 11th Magritte Awards

References

External links
 Official website

2022
2021 film awards
2022 in French cinema
2022 in Paris
February 2022 events in France